Anna Karolína Schmiedlová was the defending champion, but chose to compete in Poitiers instead.

Varvara Lepchenko won the title, defeating Verónica Cepede Royg in the final, 6–4, 6–4.

Seeds

Draw

Finals

Top half

Bottom half

References
Main Draw

Mercer Tennis Classic - Singles